102–104 Inman Street is a historic house located in Cambridge, Massachusetts. It is locally significant as one of a series of well-preserved Greek Revival duplexes on Inman Street.

Description and history 
It is a two-story wood-frame structure, six bays wide, with a side-gable roof and a central porch sheltering the pair of entrances. The house was built in 1845, and features very straightforward Greek Revival styling, most notably in the pilasters that run the full two-story height of the building, separating pairs of bays. The gable dormers in the roof have full pediments and pilasters.

The building was listed on the National Register of Historic Places on June 30, 1983.

See also
Building at 106–108 Inman Street
Buildings at 110–112 Inman Street
National Register of Historic Places listings in Cambridge, Massachusetts

References

Houses on the National Register of Historic Places in Cambridge, Massachusetts
Greek Revival houses in Massachusetts
Houses completed in 1845